Clitocybe nebularis or Lepista nebularis, commonly known as the clouded agaric or cloud funnel, is an abundant gilled fungus which appears both in conifer-dominated forests and broad-leaved woodland in Europe and North America. Appearing in Britain from late summer to late autumn, it is edible, but may cause gastrointestinal issues.

Taxonomy
The species was first described and named as Agaricus nebularis in 1789 by August Johann Georg Karl Batsch. It was later placed in the genus Clitocybe in 1871 by Paul Kummer as Clitocybe nebularis. After much consideration by many mycologists, over some years, when it was placed for periods in both Lepista, and Gymnopus, it was placed back in Clitocybe with the specific epithet, and 1871 accreditation it retains today.Clitocybe nebularis var. alba Bataille (1911), differs only in having a milk white cap, and is very rare.

Description
The cap of the mushroom is 5–25 cm (2–8 in) in diameter, convex with an incurved margin, becoming plane to depressed in shape. Cap colours are generally greyish to light brownish-grey, and often covered in a whitish bloom when young. The surface of the cap is usually dry to moist, and radially fibrillose. The gills are pale, adnate to short-decurrent, close and usually forked. It is usually somewhat lighter than the cap. The flesh is white, and very thick. It usually has a foul-smelling odour, which has been described as slightly farinaceous to rancid.

The spores are yellow and elliptical.

This species is host to the parasitic gilled mushroom Volvariella surrecta, which is found on older specimens.

Edibility
The species is edible but even a small portion can cause gastrointestinal disturbances for some people.

Gallery

Similar species
The species may be confused with the poisonous Entoloma sinuatum both in Europe or North America, though this species has pink sinuate gills. It also resembles Leucopaxillus albissimus and Tricholoma saponaceum. Leucopaxillus giganteus is also similar in stature, but is whiter. Infundibulicybe geotropa has a pale brown cap.

References

nebularis
Edible fungi
Fungi of Europe
Fungi of North America
Fungi described in 1789
Taxa named by August Batsch